Vetrikku Oruvan is a 1979 Indian Tamil language film, directed by  S. P. Muthuraman and produced by S. Baskar. The film stars Sivaji Ganesan, Sripriya, M. N. Nambiar and Mohan Babu. It was released on 8 December 1979.

Plot 

Saravanan is a cowardly, mild mannered, honest and good son to his doting and loving father Rajaraman. Rajaraman goes so far to write love letters for him as Saravanan could not manage it on his own. He is in love with Radha who Madhan vies for. Madhan is a criminal who works for Ethirajulu, a secretive don who acts like a honest businessman to the society.

Rajaraman exposes him and raids his home and office in his capacity as tax officer. In anger, Ethirajulu gets Rajaraman murdered by Madhan. This comes as a wake up call to Saravanan who decides that he wants vengeance. He, with help from Radha, learns martial arts, prepares, does background research and then proceeds to systematically destroy Ethirajulu's empire and in the end, kills him and Madhan.

Cast 
Sivaji Ganesan as Saravanan
Sripriya as Radha
M. N. Nambiar as Ethirajulu
Mohan Babu as Madhan
Major Sundarrajan as Rajaraman
Thengai Srinivasan
V. K. Ramasamy as Radha's father
Y. G. Parthasarathy as Ethirajulu's secretary
Poornam Viswanathan
Pushpalatha as Saravanan's mother

Production 
Vetrikku Oruvan Is the debut film for wig maker B. Natesan. He designed the "curly" wig that Sripriya wears in the song "Thoranam Aadidum", which he found challenging to make.

Soundtrack 
The music was composed by Ilaiyaraaja, with lyrics by Panchu Arunachalam.

Reception 
According to Muthuraman, the failed at the box-office as shoot happened without any proper planning.

References

External links 
 

1979 films
1970s Tamil-language films
Films directed by S. P. Muthuraman
Films scored by Ilaiyaraaja
Films with screenplays by Panchu Arunachalam